Gérard Thiélin (29 March 1935 – 20 September 2007) was a French professional racing cyclist. He rode in four editions of the Tour de France.

References

External links

 

1935 births
2007 deaths
French male cyclists
Sportspeople from Loir-et-Cher
Cyclists from Centre-Val de Loire